Rough grevillea is a common name for several species of plants native to Australia and may refer to:

 Grevillea aspera
 Grevillea muricata

Grevillea taxa by common name